Abdul Hakim Wardak (born 15 August 1940) is a former Afghanistan track and field athlete, who specialised in hurdling. He competed at the 1960 Summer Olympic Games in the men's 110 m hurdles and the Men's javelin throw; he failed to advance in either. He was born in Kabul.

References

1940 births
Living people
Sportspeople from Kabul
Male javelin throwers
Afghan male hurdlers
Olympic athletes of Afghanistan
Athletes (track and field) at the 1960 Summer Olympics
Afghan javelin throwers